Light crude oil is liquid petroleum that has a low density and flows freely at room temperature. It has a low viscosity, low specific gravity and high API gravity due to the presence of a high proportion of light hydrocarbon fractions. It generally has a low wax content. Light crude oil receives a higher price than heavy crude oil on commodity markets because it produces a higher percentage of gasoline and diesel fuel when converted into products by an oil refinery.

Varying standards 
The clear cut definition of light and heavy crude varies because the classification is based more on practical grounds than theoretical. The New York Mercantile Exchange (NYMEX) defines light crude oil for domestic U.S. oil as having an API gravity between 37° API (840 kg/m3) and 42° API (816 kg/m3), while it defines light crude oil for non-U.S. oil as being between 32° API (865 kg/m3) and 42° API (816 kg/m3). The National Energy Board of Canada defines light crude oil as having a density less than 875.7 kg/m3 (API gravity greater than 30.1° API). The government of Alberta, the province which produces most of the oil in Canada, disagrees and defines it as oil with a density less than 850 kg/m3 (API gravity greater than 35° API)  The Mexican state oil company, Pemex, defines light crude oil as being between 27° API (893 kg/m3) and 38° API (835 kg/m3). This variation in definition occurred because countries such as Canada and Mexico tend to have heavier crude oils than are commonly found in the United States, whose large oil fields historically produced lighter oils than are found in many other countries.

Examples of light crude oils 
A wide variety of benchmark crude oils worldwide are considered to be light. The most prominent in North America is West Texas Intermediate which has an API gravity of 39.6° API (827 kg/m3). It is often referred to by publications when quoting oil prices. The most commonly referenced benchmark oil from Europe is Brent Crude, which is 38.06° API (835 kg/m3). The third most commonly quoted benchmark is Dubai Crude, which is 31° API (871 kg/m3). This is considered light by Arabian standards but would not be considered light if produced in the U.S.

The largest oil field in the world, Saudi Arabia's Ghawar field, produces light crude oils ranging from 33° API (860 kg/m3) to 40° API (825 kg/m3)

U.S. price 
In the United States, the price of the front month light sweet crude oil futures contract, traded on the NYMEX commodity exchange (symbol CL), is widely reported as a proxy for the cost of imported crude oil. These contracts have delivery dates in all 12 months of the year. From below $20 a barrel in early 2002, it rose to an intraday peak of $70.85 at the end of August 2005 in the aftermath of Hurricane Katrina. A new intraday record high of $78.40 was set on July 14, 2006, prompted by the firing of at least six missiles by North Korea on July 4–5, 2006, and escalating Middle East violence.

Subsequently, the price declined until on October 11, 2006, the price closed at $66.04. But, by August 2007, the price had reached a record high of $78.71, amid production output concerns in the North Sea and Nigeria. On November 29, 2007, the price peaked at $98.70 intraday after closing at $98.03 the previous day. The price of light crude set a new intraday high on May 21, 2008, of $133.45 and closed at $133.17. A new high was reached on July 11, 2008, as prices temporarily reached $147.27 a barrel.

Trading 

Light crude oil is traded on the CME Globex, CME ClearPort, (CME Group) and Open Outcry (New York) futures exchange venues and is quoted in U.S. dollars and cents per barrel.

See also 
 Benchmark (crude oil)
 Brent Crude
 West Texas Intermediate
 Sweet crude oil
 Price of petroleum

Notes 

Petroleum
Oil and gas markets